Robert Stone (29 January 1749 – June 1820) was an English first-class cricketer with amateur status. He was born in Brixton and was initially associated with Surrey but he went on to represent other teams. The full span of his career is uncertain but he was definitely active between 1773 and 1780, playing in eight first-class matches. According to CricketArchive, Stone resurrected his career with two further matches in the 1790 season, but it cannot be said with certainty that this was the same man, especially as he seems to have moved from Surrey to Kent.
 There is nothing in the main source, Scores & Biographies, to suggest a link and he is always listed in its scorecards as "Stone, Esq." Stone's highest score of 35 was achieved in his first known appearance when he played for Surrey against Kent in 1773. CricketArchive credits him with 117 career runs and 3 catches.

References

Bibliography
 

1749 births
1820 deaths
English cricketers of 1787 to 1825
English cricketers
Hampshire cricketers
Kent cricketers
Marylebone Cricket Club cricketers
People from Brixton
Surrey cricketers